Kaiyuan is a county-level city in the northeast of Liaoning, People's Republic of China, bordering Jilin for a small section to the north.

Administrative divisions

There are 3 subdistricts, 9 towns, and 9 townships under the city's administration.

Subdistricts:
Xincheng Subdistrict, Laocheng Subdistrict, Xingkai Subdistrict

Towns:
Babao, Qingyunbao, Kaoshan, Yemin, Jingouzi, Zhonggu, Bakeshu, Lianhua, Weiyuanbao

Townships:
Chengdong Township, Sanjiazi Township, Songshanbao Township, Majiazhai Township, Lijiatai Township, Shangbadi Manchu Ethnic Township, Xiabadi Manchu Ethnic Township, Huangqizhai Manchu Ethnic Township, Linfeng Manchu Ethnic Township

Geography and climate
Kaiyuan is situated in northeastern Liaoning in the southeastern part of Tieling City on the eastern bank of the middle reaches of the Liao River. It borders Dongfeng County and Qingyuan Manchu Autonomous County to the east, Tieling County to the south, Faku and Changtu counties to the west, and Lishu County (Jilin) to the north. In the east, the land begins to transition to the foothills of the Changbai Mountains, while the west is marked by the Songliao Plain.

Kaiyuan has a monsoon-influenced humid continental climate (Köppen Dwa), characterised by hot, humid summers and long, cold and windy, but dry winters. The four seasons here are distinctive. A majority of the annual rainfall of  occurs in July and August alone.

Notable people
 Sheng Shicai (1897–1970), a warlord who ruled Xinjiang from 1933 to 1944.
 Xiao Jie (1957), Chinese politician
 Xiaoshenyang (1981), Chinese actor

References

External links

Cities in Liaoning
Tieling